France competed at the inaugural Summer Paralympic Games in 1960 in Rome. France's six athletes competed in four sports: archery, athletics, dartchery and swimming. All of France's athletes obtained medals in every event they competed in.

Medallists

Archery 

France entered three competitors in archery.
 Trouverie and Delapietra (full names not recorded) competed in the Men's Columbia round open. Trouverie took the gold medal with 550 points. Delapietra took silver, although his score of 544 was equal to that of Britain's Hepple, who was awarded bronze.
 In the Men's St. Nicholas round open, Figoni, for France, took silver with 648 points - behind Sutton of Australia, who scored 670, and ahead of Sones of the United States (636).

Athletics 

France's only entry in athletics was Barbier, who took gold in the Men's club throw (category B) with a throw of 38.24m.

Dartchery 

Bernabei and Trouverie, France's representatives in dartchery, finished third in the Mixed pairs open and took bronze.

Swimming 

Jarrige was France's only entry in swimming, and competed in two events:
 In the Men's 25 metre crawl juniors incomplete class 2, he was the only competitor, and won gold by completing the race with a time of 41.9.
 In the Men's 25 metre backstroke juniors incomplete class 2, he was one of only two competitors. His time of 46.8, well behind the time of 26.8 achieved by Kalberg of Norway, earned him the silver medal.

See also
France at the 1960 Summer Olympics

References

External links

International Paralympic Committee official website

Nations at the 1960 Summer Paralympics
1960
Paralympics